Gia Bugadze is a prolific contemporary Georgian artist. 
He was the Rector of the Tbilisi State Academy of Arts from 2003 to 2012.

Early life and education
Gia (Giorgi) Bugadze was born on September 24, 1956, in one of the old city areas of Tbilisi, Georgia, to a family of doctors. From an early age he showed interest in art. He acquired a classical education in the Georgian Soviet Socialist Republic. He studied at the Palace of Pioneers and Pupils, then at the Tbilisi Iakob Nikoladze Art College and finally at the Tbilisi State Academy of Arts (1977–1981), the Studio of Giorgi Totibadze and Koki Makharadze at the Faculty of Fine Arts. In 1985, he studied at the USSR Art Academy and graduated there, under headship of Ucha Japaridze.

Life and career 
He acknowledges his teacher to be the well-known Georgian artist Jibson Khundadze, the power of color, absorbed from him, was applied for a task of an artwork improvement, it was transformed and was established in its individual style, characterized by composition with live dramatics, audacity of the mastered art-piece. He has realized various personal exhibitions in Vatican- Rome, Basel, Zurich, Prague, Köln, Tallinn, Munich, Berlin, Moscow, Palermo, Barcelona, Paris, Cannes, New York, London, as well as participated in group exhibitions, international projects, and as a speaker - in international symposiums, forums, round tables and conferences (The George Washington University, Thomas Jefferson University - USA, Basel University-Switzerland.

At the end of Millennium, he turned towards educational activity. He joined the Tbilisi State Academy of Arts, initially as a teacher, later as the Dean of the Faculty of Fine Arts, and lastly as the Rector of the academy, between 2003 and 2012.
''I am the professional artist,I am the professional teacher,I am the professional listener,I am the professional reader. As for me, the books and music are the same, that the buildings are for the city. Without them, art isn’t being created in my inward, that’s why, through my art, I have been the musician, writer, teacher and also, the artist" - Gia Bugadze. 2012

Personal life 
The general characteristics of cultural circumstances of post-totalitarian countries completely affected the Georgian arts too. In these conditions, “survival” of an artist, detecting the identification point with the reality and mainly, self-realization, showed up in searching, appeared to be a hard problem. He was always supported by his spouse - a like-minded person, an art historian Ani kldiashvili. He has two children, Nino Bugadze-an architect and Lasha Bugadze- writer and dramatist, representative of the new Georgian culture.

Awards 
He has been awarded many Prizes at various   contests: in 1985 –  Best Artwork of the Year – major Prize of the contest, held by Georgian Union of Artists; five years later -  Prize of the President of France for the Best National Collection, at the International Festival in Cannes, France; in 1993 – Medal of Iakob Gogebashvili, awarded by Georgian Educators Association and Medal of Anton Catholicos ( Anton II of Georgia ) ;  in 2001 – Medal of the Ivane Javakhishvili Tbilisi State University ; in 2002 of Vatican “Carolus Magnus”.

Artwork 

Gia Bugadze achieved an early fame with the series of paintings called “Life of Kartli” (in different words History of Georgia). Since then, he often painted mythological characters, and their ‘appearance – or, ‘embodiment, or reincarnation feels as almost mystical.

Murals give full scope to his imagination, that appeals with complicated and large-scale compositions. In 2010, in Batumi, he painted the Piazza arch “Sea boarding - house”.

He has realized a wide range of mural projects in the temples and secular buildings:  Church of Martin Luther  in Berlin, and St. Nino Georgian Church in Paris; the library and   conference hall of the Tbilisi State University, the conference halls of the Ilia State University and of the Georgian Technical University; the City Hall chamber; the “Kings Chamber” of the Georgian Parliament, the Hall of  the  Ministry of Justice of Georgia ; apartment of Claudio Berlinjieri  in Rome;  the “Chamber of Freedom of Speech ‘ at the  Louisiana State University, United States; artistic panel “Tbilisi’ . His fantasies through various media are turning up in an interesting form.

Bibliography 

 თბილისის სახელმწიფო სამხატვრო აკადემია (The Tbilisi State Academy of Arts).  Tbilisi 2011..

External links 
 Georgian Art Portal 

Living people
1956 births
Tbilisi State Academy of Arts alumni
Academic staff of the Tbilisi State Academy of Arts
20th-century painters from Georgia (country)
21st-century painters from Georgia (country)